is a Japanese actress and activist. She has won four Japan Academy Best Actress awards, more than any other actress, and has been called "one of the foremost stars in the postwar world of film."

Career

Her first media appearance was in the radio drama "Akado Suzunosuke" in 1957, and she has been one of the most popular actresses in Japan since the 1960s, with fans called "Sayur-ists" (Sayurisuto) - for example, Akiyuki Nosaka and Tamori.
 
She made a contract with the movie corporation Nikkatsu and played the lead role in many of its films. In 1962, Yoshinaga played a junior-high school girl in her most famous film, "Foundry Town", and got the Japan Record Award for "Itsudemo Yume wo" (Always Keep the Dream) with the male singer Yukio Hashi. In the 1970s and 1980s, Yoshinaga appeared in films made by other companies, as well as in TV drama serials, commercials, and talk shows. After this period, she returned to films and she has featured in commercials for some big companies such as Sharp Aquos, Nissey and Kagome. She has been awarded the Japan Academy Prize four times. Yoshinaga has appeared in 123 films, mostly in the leading role. Yoshinaga starred in Kon Ichikawa's Ohan and The Makioka Sisters. She also starred in Yoji Yamada's Kabei: Our Mother and About Her Brother.

In 2012, she starred in Junji Sakamoto's A Chorus of Angels.

Character
Yoshinaga graduated from Waseda University, the Schools of Letters, Arts and Sciences II in 1969. Under a tight schedule, she took the runners-up value in the school among the graduates in that year. In 1975, she married Taro Okada, a TV director worked in Fuji Television, keeping her maiden name "Yoshinaga" as her stage name. She has no children.

From the 1980s, after playing Yumechiyo in TV drama, a hibakusha geisha by Atomic bombings of Hiroshima, she has worked for the anti-nuclear movement. Her most well-known action is reading the poems about atomic bombs over 20 years, and she worked without guarantees for voice guidance in the Hiroshima Peace Memorial Museum.  She is also famous for supporting a Nippon Professional Baseball (NPB) club, Seibu Lions. Yoshiaki Tsutsumi, the former owner of this team is a fan of Yoshinaga, and she bought a pension from Tsutsumi's Seibu Railway group.

Selected filmography

Film

Television

Awards
 1961: Elan d'or Award for Newcomer of the Year
 1962: Japan Record Award
 1984: 9th Hochi Film Award - Best Actress for Ohan and Station to Heaven
 1985: Japan Academy Prize - Outstanding Performance by an Actress in a Leading Role
 1986: Kinuyo Tanaka Award
 1989: Japan Academy Prize - Outstanding Performance by an Actress in a Leading Role
 1997: Japan Record Award for Concept
 2001: Japan Academy Prize - Outstanding Performance by an Actress in a Leading Role
 2006: Japan Academy Prize - Outstanding Performance by an Actress in a Leading Role
 2006: Medals of Honour with Purple Ribbon
 2010: Person of Cultural Merit
 2015: Kikuchi Kan Prize

References

External links

Japanese actresses
1945 births
Living people
People from Tokyo
Waseda University alumni
Recipients of the Medal with Purple Ribbon
Persons of Cultural Merit
People from Shibuya